Chlorocypha curta is a species of damselfly in the family Chlorocyphidae. It is found in Burkina Faso, Cameroon, Central African Republic, Ivory Coast, Equatorial Guinea, Ghana, Guinea, Kenya, Liberia, Nigeria, Sierra Leone, Sudan, Togo, and Uganda. Its natural habitats are subtropical or tropical moist lowland forests and rivers.

References

Chlorocyphidae
Insects described in 1853
Taxonomy articles created by Polbot